Irakkamam or Eragama is a town located in the Eragama Divisional Secretariat, Ampara District, Eastern Province, Sri Lanka which is an ancient village in south eastern as well. A tile factory is located in the territories of the town. After 1985, there was a massive growth in terms of education, culture, business and other sectors.

See also
Eragama Divisional Secretariat

External links 
 http://www.irakkamam.ds.gov.lk/

Villages in Ampara District
Irakkamam DS Division